Let the Praises Ring: The Best of Lincoln Brewster is a Christian worship music album by Lincoln Brewster released on November 7, 2006 by Integrity Music. This album compiles songs off Brewster's prior albums and includes two previously unreleased songs.

Track listing

References 

2006 albums
Lincoln Brewster albums